This is the episode list of  a Japanese tokusatsu television series produced by Tsuburaya Productions as part of the long-running Ultraman series. The series premiered on TV Tokyo on July 7, 2018.

At the end of each episode, a minisode called  aired and featuring the Minato brothers described the R/B or Monster Crystals of said episode.

Episodes



References

External links
Episode List on Ultraman R/B

R B